Mount Schurz el.  is a mountain peak in the Absaroka Range in Yellowstone National Park.  Mount Schurz is the second highest peak in Yellowstone.  The mountain was originally named Mount Doane by Henry D. Washburn during the Washburn–Langford–Doane Expedition in 1871.  Later the name Mount Doane was given to another peak in the Absaroka Range by geologist Arnold Hague.  In 1885, Hague named the mountain for the 13th U.S. Secretary of the Interior, Carl Schurz (1877–1881).  Schurz was the first Secretary of the Interior to visit Yellowstone and a strong supporter of the national park movement.

See also
 Mountains and mountain ranges of Yellowstone National Park

Notes

Schurz
Schurz
Schurz